Rebecca is a 2016 Ghana-Nigeria film directed by Shirley Frimpong-Manso, and starring Yvonne Okoro and Joseph Benjamin. According to Manso, the film was released first in London, before Ghana due to the economic situation of the country causing reduced patronage for films. The film is the second two cast film that features Nigerian born actress Yvonne Okoro.

Cast 
 Joseph Benjamin as Clifford
 Yvonne Okoro as Rebecca

Plot 
The film begins with Clifford (Joseph Benjamin) and Rebecca (Yvonne Okoro) lost in the forest after their vehicle required a repair. It is revealed that Rebecca was betrothed to Clifford since their childhood. While Rebecca remained silent all through the journey and looked unbothered by the utterances by her new husband, Clifford expresses reluctance on being happily married with her since he was only wants to fulfill the dying wish of his father. Clifford is bitten by a forest creature and this leads to the first conversation between them. Rebecca assists him in healing his wound. She also reveals to him that she was previously in love and expresses her disregard in his lack for respect and love for her. After some lengthy discussion between them, they began to get attracted to each other. Rebecca gets kidnapped by two men, this was later revealed to have been orchestrated by Rebecca and her former boyfriend. Rebecca returns to Clifford and explained her plans all along to fake her death and stop his driver from following by poisoning him. After listening and seeing the  genuineness of her plea, Clifford accepts her while they both await the rescue team.

References

External links
 

2016 films
Nigerian drama films
Films directed by Shirley Frimpong-Manso
Ghanaian drama films